The 2017 Malaysia FAM Cup (referred to as the FAM Cup or FAM League) is the 66th season of the Malaysia FAM League since its establishment in 1952. The league is currently the third level football league in Malaysia. MISC-MIFA are the previous champion and currently play in the second level of Malaysian football, Malaysia Premier League.

The season started on 19 February 2017 and concluded on 22 October 2017.

Teams 
For 2017 season, there are 16 teams currently will compete in the league where 13 teams are from last season while new teams will know from FAM.

  DBKL F.C. (promoted from KLFA Division 1 League)
  FELCRA F.C.
  Hanelang F.C.
  KDMM F.C.
  Kuching F.A. (promoted from Liga Bolasepak Rakyat)
  MOF F.C.
  MPKB-BRI U-Bes F.C.
  PBMS F.C.
  Penjara F.C.
  Petaling Jaya Rangers F.C.
  SAMB F.C. 
  Shahzan Muda S.C. 
  Sime Darby F.C. (relegated from Premier League)
  Terengganu City F.C. (New Team)
  UKM F.C.

Season Changes

( Promoted To 2017 Malaysia Premier League )
  PKNP F.C.
  MIFA

From Malaysia Premier League
( Relegated from 2016 Malaysia Premier League )
  Sime Darby

From Liga Bolasepak Rakyat
( Promoted from 2015–16 Liga Bolasepak Rakyat )
  Kuching

Team withdraw
  DYS F.C. 
  Megah Murni F.C.
  Ipoh FA
  Sungai Ara F.C.

Teams, locations and stadia

Stadium and locations

Personnel and sponsoring

Note: Flags indicate national team as has been defined under FIFA eligibility rules. Players may hold more than one non-FIFA nationality.

League stages

Group A

Group B

Fixtures and results

Fixtures and Results of the Liga FAM 2017 season.

Group A

Matchday 1

Matchday 2

Matchday 3

Matchday 4

Postponed match

Matchday 5

Matchday 6

Matchday 7

Matchday 8

Matchday 9

Postponed match

Knock-out stage

Bracket

Quarter-finals

First leg

Second leg 

UKM won 2–1 on aggregate.

Shahzan Muda won 3–1 on aggregate.

Sime Darby won 5–1 on aggregate.

Felcra won 2–1 on aggregate.

Semi-finals

First leg

Second leg 

UKM won 1–0 on aggregate after extra time.

Sime Darby won 1–0 on aggregate.

Finals

First leg

Second leg 

Sime Darby won 3–2 on aggregate.

Knock-out stage statistics

Goalscorers

References

See also 
 2017 Malaysia Super League
 2017 Malaysia Premier League
 2017 Malaysia FA Cup
 2017 Malaysia Cup
 2017 Malaysia President's Cup
 2017 Malaysia Youth League
 List of Malaysian football transfers 2017

External links
 Football Association of Malaysia website - FAM League

5
2017